The UEFA European Under-18 Championship 1957 Final Tournament was held in Spain.

Teams
The following teams entered the tournament:

 
 
 
 
 
 
 
 
 
 
 
 
 
  (host)

Group stage

Group A

Group B

Group C

Group D

Semifinals

Third place match

Final

External links
Results by RSSSF

UEFA European Under-19 Championship
Under-18
1956–57 in Spanish football
1957
April 1957 sports events in Europe
Football in Madrid
1950s in Madrid
1957 in youth association football